MC Alger may refer to:
 MC Alger (basketball), basketball section of the multi-sports club
 MC Alger (handball), handball section of the multi-sports club
 MC Alger (volleyball), men's volleyball section of the multi-sports club
 MC Alger (women's volleyball), women's volleyball section of the multi-sports club